Jodie Markell (born April 13, 1959) is an American actress and film director.

Career

Jodie Markell attended Northwestern University and studied at New York's Circle in the Square Theatre. As an actress, she has worked with theater directors such as John Patrick Shanley, John Malkovich, and Gary Sinise; film directors such as Woody Allen, Jim Jarmusch, and Barry Levinson; starred at Lincoln Center, The Public and Steppenwolf Theatre Company; and won an Obie. She is also a member of the Naked Angels.

She also directed the film The Loss of a Teardrop Diamond. The New York Times referred to the film as "the first major [Tennessee] Williams movie in decades — a reanimation of a film career that once rivaled his stage success." In a review for IFC.com, Neil Pedley said that Markell "couldn't make her debut with a sturdier piece of material than this recently unearthed screenplay of societal scandal and sexual jealousy."

Filmography

Film

Television

References

External links 
 

Living people
1959 births
American film directors
American women film directors
Actresses from Memphis, Tennessee
21st-century American women